Scheel is a surname of Germanic origin. Notable people with the surname include:
Arnd Scheel, mathematician at the University of Minnesota
Ellen Scheel, Norwegian football player
Fritz Scheel (1852–1907), German-American orchestra conductor
Georg Scheel, Norwegian barrister
Günther Scheel (1921–1943), German ace fighter pilot in the Luftwaffe during World War II
Gustav Adolf Scheel (1907–1979), German physician in the SS during the Nazi regime
Herman Scheel (1859–1956), Norwegian jurist; chief justice of the Supreme Court 1920–29
Heinrich Scheel, baltic German architect
Ingeborg Scheel, Swiss Olympic fencer
John Scheel, MD, term coiner of naturopathy
Jørgen Jacob Scheel (1916–1989), Danish aristocrat, soldier and ichthyologist
Karl Scheel (1866–1936), German physicist
Mildred Scheel (1932–1985), German doctor; second wife of Walter Scheel
Walter Scheel (1919–2016), German politician; president of the Federal Republic of Germany 1974–79
Baron Boris Vietinghoff-Scheel (1829–1901), Russian composer

See also 
Karl Scheel Prize, an award given annually by the Physikalische Gesellschaft zu Berlin
Scheels All Sports, American retailer